Vasant Kunj is a proposed Lucknow Metro station in Lucknow.

References

Lucknow Metro stations
Proposed railway stations in India